Dan Gasaway (born August 6, 1966) is an American politician who served in the Georgia House of Representatives from the 28th district from 2013 to 2019.

References

1966 births
Living people
Republican Party members of the Georgia House of Representatives